Makhmutovo (Mäxmüt) is a rural locality (a village) in Nikolayevsky Selsoviet, Beloretsky District, Bashkortostan, Russia. The population was 264 as of 2010. There are 5 streets.

Geography 
Makhmutovo is located 52 km northeast of Beloretsk (the district's administrative centre) by road. Nikolayevka is the nearest rural locality.

References 

Rural localities in Beloretsky District